The 2001 NASCAR Craftsman Truck Series was the seventh season of the Craftsman Truck Series, the third highest stock car racing series sanctioned by NASCAR in the United States. Jack Sprague of Hendrick Motorsports was crowned drivers' champion.

2001 teams and drivers

Full-time teams

Part-time teams
TABLE UNDER CONSTRUCTION / COMING SOON  Note: If under "team", the owner's name is listed and in italics, that means the name of the race team that fielded the truck is unknown.

Notes

Races

Florida Dodge Dealers 250

The Florida Dodge Dealers 250 was held on February 16 at Daytona International Speedway. Joe Ruttman won the pole.

Top 10 Results

18-Joe Ruttman
17-Ricky Hendrick
2-Scott Riggs
90-Lance Norick
61-Randy Tolsma
29-Terry Cook
20-Coy Gibbs
3-Bryan Reffner
52-Lyndon Amick
14-Rick Crawford

Florida Dodge Dealers 400K

The Florida Dodge Dealers 400K was held March 4 at Homestead-Miami Speedway.

Top 10 Results

1-Ted Musgrave
60-Travis Kvapil
24-Jack Sprague
2-Scott Riggs
17-Ricky Hendrick
61-Randy Tolsma
43-Carlos Contreras
14-Rick Crawford
18-Joe Ruttman
29-Terry Cook

This was the first career NASCAR major racing series win for Ted Musgrave.

Failed to qualify: none

OSH 250

The OSH 250 was held March 17 at Mesa Marin Raceway. Ted Musgrave won the pole.

Top 10 Results

1-Ted Musgrave
24-Jack Sprague
62-Brendan Gaughan
66-Rick Carelli
2-Scott Riggs
18-Joe Ruttman
29-Terry Cook
17-Ricky Hendrick
75-Billy Bigley
61-Randy Tolsma

Failed to qualify: none

Advance Auto Parts 250

The Advance Auto Parts 250 was held April 7 at Martinsville Speedway. Joe Ruttman won the pole.

Top 10 Results

2-Scott Riggs
60-Travis Kvapil
29-Terry Cook
18-Joe Ruttman
61-Randy Tolsma
88-Matt Crafton
14-Rick Crawford
3-Bryan Reffner
17-Ricky Hendrick
99-Nathan Haseleu

Failed to qualify: Brian Sockwell (#54), Willy T. Ribbs (#8), Stan Boyd (#7), Dana White (#23), Jim Mills (#70), Rodney Sawyers (#68)

Ram Tough 200 presented by Pepsi

The Ram Tough 200 presented by Pepsi was held May 6 at Gateway International Raceway. Ted Musgrave won the pole.

Top 10 Results

1-Ted Musgrave
2-Scott Riggs
29-Terry Cook
14-Rick Crawford
60-Travis Kvapil
17-Ricky Hendrick
88-Matt Crafton
24-Jack Sprague
46-Dennis Setzer
75-Billy Bigley

Failed to qualify: none

Darlington 200

The Darlington 200 was held May 12 at Darlington Raceway. Jack Sprague won the pole.

Top 10 Results

4-Bobby Hamilton
52-Ken Schrader
2-Scott Riggs
14-Rick Crawford
18-Joe Ruttman
60-Travis Kvapil
29-Terry Cook
88-Matt Crafton
75-Billy Bigley
99-Nathan Haseleu

Failed to qualify: none

Jelly Belly 200

The Jelly Belly 200 was held May 20 at Pikes Peak International Raceway. Scott Riggs  won the pole.

Top 10 Results

18-Joe Ruttman
2-Scott Riggs
24-Jack Sprague
1-Ted Musgrave
17-Ricky Hendrick
88-Matt Crafton
60-Travis Kvapil
46-Dennis Setzer
14-Rick Crawford
50-Chuck Hossfeld

Failed to qualify: none

MBNA E-Commerce 200

The MBNA E-Commerce 200 was held June 2 at Dover International Speedway. Scott Riggs won the pole.

Top 10 Results

2-Scott Riggs
24-Jack Sprague
17-Ricky Hendrick
1-Ted Musgrave
20-Coy Gibbs
92-Stacy Compton
52-Ken Schrader
18-Joe Ruttman
88-Matt Crafton
60-Travis Kvapil

O'Reilly 400K

The O'Reilly 400K was held June 8 at Texas Motor Speedway. Scott Riggs won the pole.

Top 10 Results

24-Jack Sprague
41-Brendan Gaughan
3-David Starr
18-Joe Ruttman
17-Ricky Hendrick
1-Dennis Setzer
20-Coy Gibbs
61-Randy Tolsma
43-Carlos Contreras
99-Nathan Haseleu

Failed to qualify: Frog Hall (#64)

Memphis 200

The Memphis 200 was held June 23 at Memphis Motorsports Park. Jack Sprague won the pole.

Top 10 Results

46-Dennis Setzer
2-Scott Riggs
18-Joe Ruttman
84-Chad Chaffin
20-Coy Gibbs
1-Ted Musgrave
17-Ricky Hendrick
90-Lance Norick
99-Greg Biffle
88-Matt Crafton

GNC Live Well 200

The GNC Live Well 200 was held June 30 at The Milwaukee Mile. Jack Sprague won the pole.

Top 10 Results

1-Ted Musgrave
24-Jack Sprague
60-Travis Kvapil
29-Terry Cook
99-Kurt Busch
18-Joe Ruttman
75-Billy Bigley
52-Ken Schrader
88-Matt Crafton
17-Ricky Hendrick

Failed to qualify: none

O'Reilly Auto Parts 250

The O'Reilly Auto Parts 250 was held July 7 at Kansas Speedway. Dennis Setzer won the pole.

Top 10 Results

17-Ricky Hendrick
1-Ted Musgrave
46-Dennis Setzer
50-Jon Wood
75-Billy Bigley
60-Travis Kvapil
2-Scott Riggs
14-Rick Crawford
20-Coy Gibbs
99-Nathan Haseleu

Failed to qualify: Doug Keller (#27)

Kroger 225

The Kroger 225 was held July 14 at Kentucky Speedway. Jack Sprague won the pole.

Top 10 Results

2-Scott Riggs
18-Joe Ruttman
24-Jack Sprague
60-Travis Kvapil
46-Dennis Setzer
17-Ricky Hendrick
50-Jon Wood
61-Randy Tolsma
29-Terry Cook
75-Billy Bigley

Failed to qualify: Michael Dokken (#71), Phil Bonifield (#23), Conrad Burr (#87), Rodney Sawyers (#68)

New England 200

The New England 200 was held July 21 at New Hampshire International Speedway. Jack Sprague won the pole.

Top 10 Results

24-Jack Sprague
60-Travis Kvapil
46-Dennis Setzer
17-Ricky Hendrick
1-Ted Musgrave
29-Terry Cook
52-Ken Schrader
18-Joe Ruttman
92-Stacy Compton
88-Matt Crafton

Failed to qualify: none

Power Stroke Diesel 200

The Power Stroke Diesel 200 was held August 3 at Indianapolis Raceway Park. Joe Ruttman won the pole. This race marked the NASCAR debut of sixteen-year-old Kyle Busch.

Top 10 Results

24-Jack Sprague
29-Terry Cook
18-Joe Ruttman
4-Bobby Hamilton
60-Travis Kvapil
14-Rick Crawford
88-Matt Crafton
46-Dennis Setzer
99-Kyle Busch
08-Bobby Dotter

Failed to qualify: Jim Mills (#70), Howard Bixman (#30), Mike Harmon (#93), G. J. Mennen Jr. (#53), Scotty Sands (#47), Morris Coffman (#71), Bob Coffey (#74)

Federated Auto Parts 200

The Federated Auto Parts 200 was held August 10 at Nashville Superspeedway. Scott Riggs won the pole.

Top 10 Results

2-Scott Riggs
1-Ted Musgrave
14-Rick Crawford
18-Joe Ruttman
60-Travis Kvapil
29-Terry Cook
99-Greg Biffle
1-Dennis Setzer
90-Lance Norick
20-Coy Gibbs

Sears Craftsman 175

The Sears Craftsman 175 was held August 18 at Chicago Motor Speedway. Joe Ruttman won the pole.

Top 10 Results

2-Scott Riggs
46-Dennis Setzer
90-Lance Norick
60-Travis Kvapil
14-Rick Crawford
29-Terry Cook
1-Ted Musgrave
18-Joe Ruttman
24-Jack Sprague
41-Brendan Gaughan

Chevy Silverado 200

The Chevy Silverado 200 was held August 26 at Nazareth Speedway. Terry Cook won the pole.

Top 10 Results

99-Greg Biffle
29-Terry Cook
24-Jack Sprague
14-Rick Crawford
17-Ricky Hendrick
50-Jon Wood
75-Billy Bigley
1-Ted Musgrave
18-Joe Ruttman
90-Lance Hooper

Failed to qualify: Clay Young (#53), Ed Spencer III (#00)

Kroger 200

The Kroger 200 was held September 6 at Richmond International Raceway. Dennis Setzer won the pole.

Top 10 Results

24-Jack Sprague
6-Kevin Harvick
46-Dennis Setzer
1-Ted Musgrave
14-Rick Crawford
92-Stacy Compton
4-Bobby Hamilton
17-Ricky Hendrick
18-Joe Ruttman
75-Billy Bigley

Failed to qualify: Tom Powers (#55), Jimmy Burns (#41)

NetZero 250 presented by John Boy & Billy

The NetZero 250 presented by John Boy & Billy was held September 28 at South Boston Speedway. Jack Sprague won the pole.

Top 10 Results

1-Ted Musgrave
46-Dennis Setzer
2-Scott Riggs
24-Jack Sprague
18-Joe Ruttman
17-Ricky Hendrick
29-Terry Cook
60-Travis Kvapil
16-Mike Bliss
88-Matt Crafton

Failed to qualify: James Stephenson (#36)

Silverado 350K

The Silverado 350 was held October 5 at Texas Motor Speedway. Scott Riggs won the pole.

Top 10 Results

60-Travis Kvapil*
14-Rick Crawford
24-Jack Sprague
3-David Starr
90-Lance Norick
46-Dennis Setzer
20-Coy Gibbs
17-Ricky Hendrick
18-Joe Ruttman
1-Ted Musgrave

This was Kvapil's first truck series victory.

Orleans 350K

The Orleans 350 was held October 14 at Las Vegas Motor Speedway. Jack Sprague won the pole.

Top 10 Results

1-Ted Musgrave
24-Jack Sprague
60-Travis Kvapil
2-Scott Riggs
14-Rick Crawford
17-Ricky Hendrick
3-David Starr
18-Joe Ruttman
99-Kurt Busch
46-Dennis Setzer

Failed to qualify: Tom Powers (#55), Michael Dokken (#23), Mike Hamby (#90), Donny Morelock (#0)

Chevy Silverado 150

The Chevy Silverado 150 was held October 26 at Phoenix International Raceway. Stacy Compton won the pole.

Top 10 Results

99-Greg Biffle
24-Jack Sprague
14-Rick Crawford
92-Stacy Compton
41-Bryan Reffner
1-Ted Musgrave
29-Terry Cook
2-Scott Riggs
60-Travis Kvapil
52-Ken Schrader

Failed to qualify: Eric Jones (#34), Auggie Vidovich (#70), D. J. Hoelzle (#85), G. J. Mennen Jr. (#53), Tom Powers (#55), Jerry Hill (#93), Phil Bonifield (#25), Gene Christensen (#07)

Auto Club 200

The Auto Club 200 was held November 3 at California Speedway. Scott Riggs won the pole.

Top 10 Results

1-Ted Musgrave
14-Rick Crawford
50-Jon Wood
46-Dennis Setzer
3-David Starr
29-Terry Cook
60-Travis Kvapil
02-Jim Inglebright
88-Matt Crafton
17-Ricky Hendrick

Kyle Busch was the fastest in practice when he was ejected from the track by CART officials because the American Racing Wheels 200 was part of a CART weekend featuring the Marlboro 500 CART FedEx Championship Series event. Marlboro threw Busch out of the garage because of an interpretation of the Master Settlement Agreement of 1998, prohibiting persons under 18 years of age in participating in events sponsored by tobacco companies. Due to that, Tim Woods III took over Busch's truck; NASCAR subsequently set an minimum age limit of 18 across all top three national series the following season, primarily as the Cup Series was also then sponsored by another cigarette brand, Winston.  Kyle's response to the new minimum age limit was to switch to another racing league for 2002, before returning to NASCAR after turning 18 as a Hendrick Motorsports development driver.
This was the last time the Truck Series concluded at California. From 2002 to 2019, all three series have had the season finale at the Homestead-Miami Speedway.

Failed to qualify: Ronnie Hornaday (#07), Mike Hamby (#09), Tom Powers (#55), Conrad Burr (#87), G. J. Mennen Jr. (#71), Phil Bonifield (#23)

Final Points Standings 

Jack Sprague – 3670
Ted Musgrave – 3597
Joe Ruttman – 3570
Travis Kvapil – 3547
Scott Riggs – 3526
Ricky Hendrick – 3412
Terry Cook – 3327
Rick Crawford – 3320
Dennis Setzer – 3306
Coy Gibbs – 2875
Lance Norick – 2820
Matt Crafton – 2778
Billy Bigley – 2718
Carlos Contreras – 2586
Bobby Dotter – 2537
Willy T. Ribbs – 2319
Jon Wood – 1917
Randy Tolsma – 1859
Lance Hooper – 1720
Jimmy Hensley – 1708
Tom Powers – 1627
Brian Rose 1487
Larry Gunselman – 1461
Nathan Haseleu – 1419
Jerry Hill – 1214
Morgan Shepherd – 1146
Ricky Sanders – 1091
Ken Schrader – 1053
Jim Inglebright – 1033
Bryan Reffner – 952
Brendan Gaughan – 946
Chuck Hossfeld – 933
Phil Bonifield – 932
Michael Dokken – 884
Stan Boyd – 848
Tom Carey – 847
Nathan Buttke – 767
Bobby Hamilton –  707
Rodney Sawyers – 689
Rick Carelli – 675
Greg Biffle – 664
Kyle Busch – 642
Jason White – 637
Stacy Compton – 598
Ronnie Hornaday – 585
Jonathon Price – 556
David Starr – 541
Dana White – 529
Trent Owens – 525
Donnie Neuenberger – 516

Full Drivers' Championship

(key) Bold – Pole position awarded by time. Italics – Pole position set by owner's points. * – Most laps led.

Rookie of the Year 
After winning once and finishing fourth in points, Travis Kvapil of Addington Racing was named the Truck Series Rookie of the Year, narrowly defeating Ricky Hendrick, teammate to champion Jack Sprague. Matt Crafton and Billy Bigley both posted several top-tens during the season and finished close to each other in points. Jon Wood, Brian Rose, Larry Gunselman, and Ricky Sanders all made limited runs, while Willy T. Ribbs became the first African American to make a full-time bid for the Craftsman Truck Series championship. Chuck Hossfeld and Nathan Haseleu signed to drive for Roush Racing after winning its "Gong Show" competition, but were released early in the season.

See also  
 2001 NASCAR Winston Cup Series
 2001 NASCAR Busch Series

References

External links 

Craftsman Truck Series standings and statistics for 2001 - Racing-Reference.info
2001 Results - NASCAR.com

NASCAR Truck Series seasons